Nathaniël Will (born 16 February 1989) is a Dutch footballer who plays as a right back for SV Spakenburg in the Tweede Divisie.

Career
Before joining NEC, he played at Ajax. In June 2007, Will signed his first professional contract with Ajax. After two seasons, he became captain of Jong Ajax in the season 2009–10. Will never made an official appearance for Ajax' first team, but did play a few friendly matches. Right before his contract expired he won the Chippi Polar Cup with Ajax' first team.

Ajax let Will go after his contract expired 30 June 2010. Former NEC-coach Wiljan Vloet signed Will as NEC's right-back for the 2010–11 season. He signed a two-year contract, with a possible extension of two years. After the 2012–13 season, Will was released by NEC.

In August 2017, Will signed a contract until the end of the season with Finnish club RoPS.

On 8 December 2017, SV Spakenburg announced the signing of Will until the end of the 2017–18 season.

References

1989 births
Living people
Dutch footballers
Dutch expatriate footballers
NEC Nijmegen players
De Graafschap players
Rovaniemen Palloseura players
SV Spakenburg players
Eredivisie players
Eerste Divisie players
Tweede Divisie players
Derde Divisie players
Veikkausliiga players
Footballers from Lelystad
Association football defenders
Association football midfielders
Expatriate footballers in Finland
Dutch expatriate sportspeople in Finland